Hassa Horn may refer to:

Hassa Horn, Sr. (1837–1921), Norwegian civil servant, father of the latter
Hassa Horn, Jr. (1873–1968), Norwegian road engineer, industrialist, sports official and politician